Sophia Jawad  is an Iraqi actress based in the United Arab Emirates.

Biography 
Sophia Jawad is a Middle Eastern actress of Iraqi descent. She has been performing since she was a child and studied acting and filmmaking at New York Film Academy, Abu Dhabi, graduating in 2010. With her unique look, Jawad can play numerous international roles. She has appeared in many films and made over 20 short student films. In theater, she played Gertrude in Shakespeare's Hamlet. In September 2012, she was preparing the role of Saira, the undercover agent wife, for an American movie to be released, Mobster: A Call for the New Order, directed by Nagendra Karri, as yet unreleased (June 2015).

Away from acting, Jawad is listed with numerous modeling agencies and has appeared in commercials.

In 2010,she attended the Abu Dhabi Film Festival for the movie, Sun Dress,

She is fluent in English, Arabic and basic Korean.

Jawad is currently the presenter of IGN's weekly fix episodes.

Filmography 
 Wind (2010) - woman, short UAE film directed by Waleed Al Shehhi
 Sun Dress, - Halima (2010) UAE feature film, directed By Saeed Salmeen.
 Tombs Secrets (2010)
 In case you forget! – Sarah (2012) UAE short film directed by Fatimah Hellal
 Street Of Laugh (2012)  comedy series for ADTV as a main for 12 episodes
 DJINN UAD clan woman - 2011 feature film directed by Tobe Hooper
 Mobster: A Call for the New Order (unreleased) directed by Nagendra Karri

References

External links 
 Sophia's IMDB
 Sophia Jawad
 Sophia's Facebook

1986 births
Living people
Iraqi film actresses
Iraqi expatriates in the United Arab Emirates
New York Film Academy alumni
Iraqi